Events from the year 1650 in Germany.

Events 

Topographia Bohemiae, Moraviae et Silesiae in Topographia Germaniae is published

Births 

 August of Saxe-Weissenfels
 Johann Anton Coberg
 Ernest, Count of Stolberg-Ilsenburg

Deaths 

 Sophie Elisabeth of Brandenburg
 Agnes of Hesse-Kassel
 Simon Philip, Count of Lippe
 Heinrich von Schlick
 Bartholomeus Strobel

1650s in the Holy Roman Empire